Tate Gymnasium is a historic building in Tate, Georgia built in 1923 to serve the local high school. It was added to the National Register of Historic Places on December 12, 2002. It is located at 5600 Georgia 53 East.

It was built by Col. Sam Tate, president of Georgia Marble Company, workers of that company, and other "community artisans", with all expenses paid by the Colonel and the Georgia Marble Company.

See also
Georgia Marble Company and Tate Historic District
Tate House (Tate, Georgia)
National Register of Historic Places listings in Pickens County, Georgia

References

National Register of Historic Places in Georgia (U.S. state)
Buildings and structures in Pickens County, Georgia
Gyms in the United States
National Register of Historic Places in Pickens County, Georgia
1923 establishments in Georgia (U.S. state)
Sports venues completed in 1923